Meola is an Italian surname. Notable people with the surname include:

Antonio Meola (born 1990), Italian footballer
Edgardo di Meola (1950–2005), Argentine footballer
Eric Meola (born 1946), American photographer
Massimo Meola (born 1953), Italian footballer
Mike Meola (1905–1976), American baseball player
Tony Meola (born 1969), American soccer player

See also
Al Di Meola (born 1954), American musician
Meola Glacier, a glacier of Uttarakhand, India

Italian-language surnames